Nova Olinda is a village in the eastern part of São Tomé Island in São Tomé and Príncipe. Its population is 107 (2012 census). It lies 2 km southwest of Santana.

References

Populated places in Cantagalo District